Otesánek is a Czech fairy tale created by Karel Jaromír Erben in the 19th century which tells the story of a fearsome and constantly hungry, living log of wood. In the story there are elements of narrative that are similar to more famous fairy tales such as The Adventures of Pinocchio and Little Red Riding Hood; despite this, the themes present in Otesánek appear nonetheless to be quite different from most other European fairy tales, with a particularly ambiguous moral which leaves a lot of room to subjective interpretation.

Plot
The story begins with a couple that for a long time has been waiting for a child, which, however, does not seem to arrive. One day the husband finds in the nearby forest a log of wood (Otesánek) that strangely resembles a baby and decides to bring it home. To the joy of the couple, the wooden baby comes to life and asks to be fed. Initially the couple is enthusiastic that their wish of having a child has finally been granted; however, the situation soon takes a turn for the worse as they find themselves having to deal with the insatiable appetite of the baby, who will keep growing and eating until he will start eating people, including his parents. The log anticipates each meal with a nursery rhyme in which he lists every previous meal he has eaten. The story eventually concludes with the death of Otesánek at the hands of an elderly lady of the village who rips open his chest with a hoe, thus killing the monster and freeing all those he ate, including his parents.

Film adaptation
The film Little Otik, directed by Jan Švankmajer, was released in 2000 and is greatly inspired by this fairy tale.

In popular culture
In the seventh episode of the third season of Blown Away, a television glass blowing competition, glass blowers John Moran and John Sharvin created a sculpture of the baby "Little Otik", which they called Alive, and Well?.

References

External links
 Otesánek, fairy tale in Czech, www.pohadky.unas.cz
 Otesánek, fairy tale in Czech, www.abatar.cz

Czech fairy tales
Child characters in fairy tales
Fictional trees
Fictional monsters